Hillside Acres is a census-designated place (CDP) in Webb County, Texas, United States. This was a new CDP formed from parts of the Ranchitos Las Lomas CDP prior to the 2010 census with a population of 30.

It is one of several colonias in the county.

Geography
Hillside Acres is located at  (27.676165, -99.177706).

Education
Residents are in the United Independent School District. Zoned schools include: Dr. Henry Cuellar Elementary School, Antonio Gonzalez Middle School, and United South High School.

The designated community college for Webb County is Laredo Community College.

References

Census-designated places in Webb County, Texas
Census-designated places in Texas